Pazim is the second tallest building in Szczecin, Poland, after the St. James Cathedral, if including Pazim's spire. It contains twenty-three floors and is 92 meters tall. The building was designed by Milijenko Dumencić. It is the headquarters of Polsteam, with its name originating from company's alternative name abbreviation, PŻM.

Description 
Pazim is used as an office building, banking and retail center, and Radisson Blu hotel, and houses a two-story underground parking. Including the antenna mast, it measures 128 meters tall. The top floor contains a cafe, above which there is a technical floor where people operate the apparatus on the antenna mast.

See also
 List of tallest buildings in Poland

References

External links

PAZIM Center at Emporis.com

Skyscraper office buildings in Poland
Buildings and structures in Szczecin
Office buildings completed in 1992